Sandy Scott may refer to:

Sandy Scott, Canadian wrestler (1934–2010)
Sandy Scott (footballer), Scottish footballer (1922–1995)
Sandy Scott (singer), Australian singer (born 1941)